Vinicius Machado may refer to:

 Vinicius Zorin-Machado (born 1982), Brazilian actor and producer
 Vinicius Machado (footballer) (born 2000), Brazilian footballer